Sheding Nature Park is a nature park within Kenting National Park, in Hengchun Township, Pingtung County, Taiwan.

History
Sheding used to be the settlement area of the Paiwan people. It is currently used as the research center and conservation of wildlifes.

Geology
The park spans over an area of 128.7 hectares. It features rock formations formed from ancient coral reefs and has many limestone caves. It also hosts 329 species of plants and animals. The park also features several hiking trails and viewing platforms.

See also
 Geography of Taiwan

References

Geography of Pingtung County
Parks in Pingtung County
Tourist attractions in Pingtung County